The Order of Karađorđe's Star is Serbia's highest civilian and military decoration. It originated in the Kingdom of Serbia, and was initially awarded exclusively to Serbian citizens in return for services rendered to the Serbian monarchy, the Serb people and the Serbian state, though it is now bestowed upon Serbs and non-Serbs alike. During the Balkan Wars and World War I, the Order was mostly awarded for acts of bravery on the battlefield. The post-war Kingdom of Yugoslavia retained the Order, and it was awarded by the Yugoslav government-in-exile until the end of World War II, in some cases to individuals who collaborated with the Axis powers. Following the war, the monarchy was outlawed and a communist government came to power. Along with other monarchist symbols, the Order was suppressed during the administration of Josip Broz Tito, and replaced with communist decorations such as the Order of the People's Hero. During the Cold War, it had been awarded by the Karađorđević family in exile.

Following the breakup of Yugoslavia, Serbia ceased using many of the awards and decorations established during the communist period, though it was not until 2010 that the Serbian Government officially reinstated the Order of Karađorđe's Star as Serbia's highest decoration. It continues as a dynastic order, with appointments currently made by Alexander, Crown Prince of Yugoslavia.

History

The Order of Karađorđe's Star was instituted by the royal decree of King Peter I on 1 January 1904, commemorating his recent accession to the Serbian throne, as well as the one-hundredth anniversary of the First Serbian Uprising. It was meant to replace the Order of the Cross of Takovo and the Order of Miloš the Great, two decorations that had been awarded by the rival Obrenović dynasty, which ruled Serbia prior to the May 1903 coup d'état that reinstated Peter's Karađorđević dynasty after several decades in exile. The first award was disagreeable to the Karađorđevićes and their supporters because it was named after Takovo, the village where Obrenović dynasty founder Miloš Obrenović had launched the Second Serbian Uprising. The Order of Miloš the Great had to be replaced as it was named after Obrenović himself.

Initially, the Order of Karađorđe's Star was categorized as a senior state award, and organized into four classes. The Grand Cross of Karađorđe's Star, the highest class, consisted of a badge of the Order on a sash and breast star; a Grand Officer of Karađorđe's Star was decorated with a badge necklet and a slightly smaller breast star; a Commander of Karađorđe's Star was only awarded a badge necklet; and the recipient of the Order's fourth class, the Officer of Karađorđe's Star, would receive a small triangular chest ribbon. The Order was usually awarded for services to the Karađorđević dynasty, the Serbian state or the Serb people, while Karađorđević princes received a Grand Cross at baptism. Recipients included both soldiers and civilians, though until 1906 only Serbian citizens were permitted to receive the award.

During the Balkan Wars (1912–13), the Serbian Government introduced the War Merit Order of Karađorđe's Star to reward acts of "conspicuous gallantry of commissioned officers in the field", as well as the battlefield victories of the Royal Serbian Army's senior officers; non-commissioned officers (NCOs) and soldiers in the field were ineligible. In June 1915, at the height of World War I, Serbia instituted a sub-division of the War Merit Order, called the Military Order, which was awarded to NCOs and men for bravery in combat. The War Merit Order was divided into two classes: the 1st division Gold Cross and the 2nd division Silver Cross. One of the recipients of the Military Order was the highly decorated female soldier Milunka Savić, and another was Flora Sandes, the only British woman to openly serve as a soldier in the war. Several senior Serbian military leaders were recipients of the War Merit Order, including Prince Regent Alexander, and Field marshals Živojin Mišić and Stepa Stepanović. Foreign recipients included American General John J. Pershing, the British Field marshal Douglas Haig, the French generals Joseph Joffre, Maurice Sarrail, Philippe Pétain, and Louis Franchet d'Espèrey, and King Ferdinand I of Romania.

The Kingdom of Yugoslavia retained the Order after World War I. In 1939, it was awarded to the city of Belgrade. During World War II, Peter II bestowed the Order upon a number of Chetniks on the recommendation of Chetnik leader Draža Mihailović. Some of the decorated Chetnik commanders included Pavle Đurišić, Dobroslav Jevđević, Momčilo Đujić, Brane Bogunović and Uroš Drenović. These decorations proved controversial both during and after the war, as many of the commanders cooperated with the armed forces of Germany, Italy or even Independent State of Croatia against the Communist-led Yugoslav Partisans for most of the occupation period. Such a discrepancy can best be seen in the case of Đujić, who was given the Order for displaying "gallantry in the face of the enemy", and subsequently celebrated receiving it at an Italian general's headquarters. In Jevđević's case, the Order was given in 1943 for his services to the Serb population of Herzegovina during a series of Ustaše massacres, but Mihailović had news of the award suppressed, because Jevđević had visited Rome to plan an anti-communist offensive with the Italians and his forces had carried out several massacres of non-Serbs over the previous several years.

After the war, Yugoslavia came under the rule of communist president Josip Broz Tito, and Karađorđević-era medals and orders were replaced by non-royal decorations, such as the Order of the People's Hero. In the 1990s, the Republika Srpska instated its own decoration also called the Order of Karađorđe's Star, though this is not to be confused with the medal historically awarded by Serbia and the Karađorđević dynasty.

In 2010, the Government of Serbia decided to reinstate the Order as an official state award, though the Karađorđević's had continued giving the award in exile over the previous sixty years. In February 2012, tennis player Novak Djokovic became the first person to receive the Order after it was reinstated. In September 2018, retired Chief of the General Staff Ljubiša Diković became the recipient of the order. In 2020, Nobel Prize winner Peter Handke and Columbia University Professor Gordana Vunjak-Novakovic received the order.

Design
The Order comes in either gold or silver depending on class, and the obverse features a white enameled cross pattée with gilt rays protruding from each of the arms. The rays are intersected diagonally by a pair of sabres when the recipient is awarded an Order "with swords". Orders from the royal period contain a blue medallion at the centre depicting a Serbian cross with a fire-steel at each corner, with the words "For Faith and Freedom, 1804" etched into the small circle in the middle of the cross. The reverse of these Orders contains a red medallion depicting a white eagle, with the words "Peter I, 1904" written around it. The bravery medals awarded from June 1915 forward are almost identical to the Orders awarded before that date, save for the crossed swords being present on all of them regardless of class. Such Orders also lacked the phrase etched into the obverse of the older ones and the date 1904 on the reverse, which marked the centenary of the First Serbian Uprising. Instead, they merely had King Peter's name on the obverse beside the year when the Order was bestowed. The Orders themselves were originally manufactured by foreign makers of decorations and medals, such as France's Arthus-Bertrand and Switzerland's Huguenin Fréres; during the interwar period (1919–39) they were produced domestically.

Footnotes

References

Works cited
Books

 
 
 
 
 
 
 
 
 
 
 

Websites

 
 
 
 
 
 
 

1904 establishments in Serbia
Awards established in 1904
Karadorde's Star
Orders, decorations, and medals of the Kingdom of Serbia
Karadorde's Star